Vysotsky (masculine), Vysotskaya (feminine), or Vysotskoye (neuter) is the name of several rural localities in Russia.

Modern localities
Vysotsky (rural locality), a settlement in Staroselsky Rural Administrative Okrug of Unechsky District in Bryansk Oblast; 
Vysotskoye, Kaluga Oblast, a village in Ferzikovsky District of Kaluga Oblast
Vysotskoye, Opochetsky District, Pskov Oblast, a village in Opochetsky District of Pskov Oblast
Vysotskoye, Pskovsky District, Pskov Oblast, a village in Pskovsky District of Pskov Oblast
Vysotskoye (Shchukinskaya Rural Settlement), Pustoshkinsky District, Pskov Oblast, a village in Pustoshkinsky District of Pskov Oblast; municipally, a part of Shchukinskaya Rural Settlement of that district
Vysotskoye (Alolskaya Rural Settlement), Pustoshkinsky District, Pskov Oblast, a village in Pustoshkinsky District of Pskov Oblast; municipally, a part of Alolskaya Rural Settlement of that district
Vysotskoye, Stavropol Krai, a selo in Vysotsky Selsoviet of Petrovsky District in Stavropol Krai
Vysotskoye, Kurkinsky District, Tula Oblast, a village in Krestovskaya Volost of Kurkinsky District in Tula Oblast
Vysotskoye, Uzlovsky District, Tula Oblast, a selo in Fedorovskaya Rural Administration of Uzlovsky District in Tula Oblast
Vysotskoye, Gavrilov-Yamsky District, Yaroslavl Oblast, a village in Stoginsky Rural Okrug of Gavrilov-Yamsky District in Yaroslavl Oblast
Vysotskoye, Yaroslavsky District, Yaroslavl Oblast, a selo in Lyutovsky Rural Okrug of Yaroslavsky District in Yaroslavl Oblast
Vysotskaya, Tyumen Oblast, a village in Prokutkinsky Rural Okrug of Ishimsky District in Tyumen Oblast
Vysotskaya, Yaroslavl Oblast, a village in Okhotinsky Rural Okrug of Myshkinsky District in Yaroslavl Oblast

Alternative names
Vysotskoye, alternative name of Vysokoye, a selo in Morachevsky Rural Administrative Okrug of Zhiryatinsky District in Bryansk Oblast;